Bard Asiab (also Romanized as Bard Āsīāb and Bard Āsyab; also known as Bard Āsīā) is a village in Cheshmeh Langan Rural District, in the Central District of Fereydunshahr County, Isfahan Province, Iran. At the 2006 census, its population was 41, in 10 families.

References 

Populated places in Fereydunshahr County